Myrick–Yeates–Vaughan House, also known as the Yeates–Vaughan House, Uriah Vaughan Jr. House, and Sarah Vaughan House, was a historic home located at Murfreesboro, Hertford County, North Carolina.  The "T"-plan house consisted of an earlier -story Federal style rear section with a two-story Greek Revival style front section. The Greek Revival was built between 1851 and 1855.  It was owned by Congressman Jesse Johnson Yeates (1829-1892) during the 1870s. The house has been demolished.

It was listed on the National Register of Historic Places in 1983.

References

Houses on the National Register of Historic Places in North Carolina
Federal architecture in North Carolina
Greek Revival houses in North Carolina
Houses completed in 1855
Houses in Hertford County, North Carolina
National Register of Historic Places in Hertford County, North Carolina
Buildings and structures in Murfreesboro, North Carolina
Demolished buildings and structures in North Carolina